James Lord (November 27, 1922 – August 23, 2009) was an American writer. He was the author of several books, including critically acclaimed biographies of Alberto Giacometti and Pablo Picasso. He appeared in the documentary films Balthus Through the Looking Glass (1996) and Picasso: Magic, Sex, Death (2001).

Life and career
Lord was born in Englewood, New Jersey, and grew up there, the son of Louise and Albert Lord. His father was a stockbroker, and until the Wall Street crash the family lived, as Lord put it, in "the lower echelons  of the upper classes". He graduated from Englewood School for Boys (now Dwight-Englewood School) in 1940.

Lord attended Wesleyan University, though he never earned a degree. He served in the United States Army during World War II and was part of the Ritchie Boys who specialized in Military Intelligence. He wrote about his experiences in his book, My Queer War which discusses keeping his homosexuality carefully hidden.

Lord died of a heart attack in Paris, at the age of 86.

In popular culture
The 2017 movie Final Portrait retells the story of his friendship with the painter Alberto Giacometti. Lord is played by Armie Hammer.

Selected bibliography

Biographies and novels

Essays

References

External links
James Lord Papers. General Collection, Beinecke Rare Book and Manuscript Library, Yale University.

1922 births
2009 deaths
American male non-fiction writers
Dwight-Englewood School alumni
American gay writers
LGBT people from New Jersey
People from Englewood, New Jersey
Wesleyan University alumni
20th-century American biographers
20th-century male writers
20th-century American male writers
Ritchie Boys
American expatriates in France
20th-century LGBT people